There have been 336 modern Summer Olympic athletes, who made their Olympic debut between the 2004 and 2020 Games, inclusive, who have identified as lesbian, gay, bisexual, transgender, pansexual, non-binary, queer, or who have openly been in a same-sex relationship, including one who has also competed at the Winter Olympic Games.

LGBT+ Summer Olympians who hold Olympic records include footballers Pia Sundhage and Vivianne Miedema; rower Emma Twigg; and triple jumper Yulimar Rojas, who also holds the world record. At least 136 LGBT+ Summer Olympians who debuted 2004–2020 are medalists (40.48%), of which 58 have at least one gold medal (17.26%).

Overview

Key 

Tables are default sorted by first Games appearance chronologically, then current surname or common nickname alphabetically, then first name alphabetically. They can be sorted by current surname (where used) or common nickname alphabetically; by country and sport alphabetically; by Games chronologically; and by medals as organised in Olympics medals tables.

Summer Olympic athletes (2004–2020)

Notes

References

Sources 

Summer Olympians 2004
LGBT Summer 2004